The International Registration Plan (IRP) is a registration reciprocity agreement between the contiguous United States and Canadian provinces, which provides apportioned payments of registration fees, based on the total distance operated in participating jurisdictions, to them. IRP's fundamental principle is to promote and encourage the fullest possible use of the highway system.

The benefit of this plan is that a carrier may be registered in only their home state, yet legally engage in interstate/interprovincial commerce. Each carrier vehicle only needs one specially marked "Apportioned", "APP", or "PRP" license plate, and a cab card which lists each jurisdiction the vehicle is valid to do business in and how much weight it is registered to carry.

Two major transportation companies under IRP are U-Haul and Greyhound Lines.

Apportionable vehicles: any vehicle intended for use of transporting a person for hire or property, within the contiguous United States and/or Canadian provinces, that drives on:
two axles having a gross vehicle weight, a registered gross vehicle weight or a gross combination weight in excess of 
three or more axles

Exceptions: recreational vehicles, vehicles displaying restricted plates, buses used in the transportation of chartered parties, government-owned vehicles

References 

Canadian transport law
United States transportation law